Earias chlorodes is a moth of the family Nolidae. It is found along the eastern coast of Australia, from Cooktown to Sydney.

The wingspan is about 20 mm.

External links
Moths of Australia

Nolidae
Moths described in 1902